Porrhoclubiona is a genus of sac spiders that was first described as a subgenus of Clubiona by H. Lohmander in 1944. Clubiona is a polyphyletic group that has been divided and reorganized many times, and whether this genus is a synonym of Clubiona or an independent genus is still under debate.

Species
 it contains thirteen species, found in Africa, Europe, and Asia:
Porrhoclubiona bosmansi Marusik & Omelko, 2018 – Tajikistan
Porrhoclubiona decora (Blackwall, 1859) – Madeira, Azores
Porrhoclubiona diniensis (Simon, 1878) – Algeria, Morocco, Tunisia, Portugal, Spain, France, Italy
Porrhoclubiona genevensis (L. Koch, 1866) (type) – Europe, Turkey, Caucasus, Russia (Europe to South Siberia), Iran, Central Asia
Porrhoclubiona laudata (O. Pickard-Cambridge, 1885) – China
Porrhoclubiona leucaspis (Simon, 1932) – Europe, Algeria, Morocco, Tunisia
Porrhoclubiona minor (Wunderlich, 1987) – Canary Is.
Porrhoclubiona moradmandi Marusik & Omelko, 2018 – Iran
Porrhoclubiona pseudominor (Wunderlich, 1987) – Canary Is.
Porrhoclubiona pteronetoides (Deeleman-Reinhold, 2001) – Thailand
Porrhoclubiona vegeta (Simon, 1918) – Canary Is., North Africa, Southern Europe, Caucasus, Iran
Porrhoclubiona viridula (Ono, 1989) – China, Taiwan, Thailand, Japan (Ryukyu Is.), Indonesia (Lesser Sunda Is.)
Porrhoclubiona wunderlichi (Mikhailov, 1992) – Mongolia

In synonymy:
P. baborensis (Denis, 1937) = Porrhoclubiona diniensis (Simon, 1878)
P. parallelos (Yin, Yan, Gong & Kim, 1996) = Porrhoclubiona viridula (Ono, 1989)
P. tenerifensis (Wunderlich, 1992, sub Microclubiona) = Porrhoclubiona vegeta (Simon, 1918)

References

External links

Araneomorphae genera
Clubionidae